Flameshovel Records is a record label from Chicago, Illinois formed in the summer of 2000.  Founded by Jesse Woghin and long-time friend Nash Grey, the duo were later joined by James Kenler. Grey left for Philadelphia in 2003 to start grad school but the remaining partners forged ahead.

The label has since put out 43 releases, including releases by Maritime, Chin Up Chin Up, Lying in States, and Bound Stems.

As of December 5, 2010, the label had not released an album since September 2007.

Artists who have released material on Flameshovel
Bound Stems
Che Arthur
Chin Up Chin Up
Viza-Noir
The Dudley Corporation
The End of the World
Joan of Arse
The Joggers
Judah Johnson
Low Skies
Lukestar
Lying in States
Make Believe
Mannequin Men
Maritime
The Narrator
The Race
Russian Circles
Smoking Popes
Sybris
Voltage
White Savage

See also
 List of record labels

External links
 Official website

American record labels
Record labels established in 2001
Alternative rock record labels
Indie rock record labels